Mike Janis is a race car driver from Lancaster, New York. Janis began drag racing in 1978. He won the 2001 and 2004 IHRA Pro Mod World Championships. In 2018, he won the NHRA Pro Mod World Championship.

References

Living people
People from Lancaster, New York
Dragster drivers
Racing drivers from New York (state)
Year of birth missing (living people)